, literally The Esthetics of Boy Love, was a bimonthly manga compilation authored by shotacon artists in Japan. The title mimics that of a philosophical work on sexuality and homosexuality by Inagaki Taruho. The first volume was published in 2003 by AV Comics, the adult product branch of Shobukan, with the intention of reviving the market for shotacon magazines. Each issue of the seventeen volume series follows a theme such as cross-dressing, omorashi, field trip, or incest. Shōnen Ai no Bigaku did not include straight shota.

Artists
Shōnen Ai no Bigaku published a number of recurring manga artists.

 Akio Takami (秋緒たかみ)
 Chiyu 12 Sai (ちゆ１２歳)
 Dohi Kensuke (土肥けんすけ)
 Ebi Chiriko (海老知里子)
 Hoshiai Hiro (星逢ひろ)
 Inaba Cozy (稲葉ＣＯＺＹ)
 Inumaru (犬丸)
 Kawada Shōgo (かわだ章吾)
 Mitsui Jun (三井純)
 Po-Ju (ぽ～じゅ)
 Sakamoto Hayato (坂本ハヤト)
 Sasorigatame (さそりがため)
 Tsuduki Mayoi (ツヅキ真宵)
 Yamano Kitsune (矢間野狐)
 Yokoyama Chicha (よこやまちちゃ)

Issues

See also
Shotacon

References

 

2003 establishments in Japan
2008 disestablishments in Japan
Defunct magazines published in Japan
Erotica magazines published in Japan
Men's magazines published in Japan
Magazines established in 2003
Magazines disestablished in 2008
Pornographic manga magazines
Bi-monthly manga magazines published in Japan